The Six Steeds of Zhao Mausoleum are six Tang (618–907) Chinese stone reliefs of horses (1.7m x 2.0m each) which were located in the Zhao Mausoleum, Shaanxi, China. Zhao Mausoleum is the mausoleum of Emperor Taizong of Tang (r. 626–649). 

By tradition the reliefs were designed by the court painter, and administrator for public works, Yan Liben, and the relief is so flat and linear that it seems likely they were carved after drawings or paintings.  Yan Liben is documented as producing other works for the tomb, a portrait series that is now lost, and perhaps designed the whole structure.

The steeds were six precious war horses of Taizong, which he rode during the early campaigns to reunify China under the Tang, and all bear names which are not Chinese but rather transliterations of Turkic or Central Asian terms, indicative of the horses' probable origin as gifts or tributes from the Tujue to the Tang forces. They are:

 Quanmaogua, Taizong's steed during the campaign against Liu Heita.
 Shifachi, ridden during the Battle of Hulao against Dou Jiande. Its name derives from the Turkic term Shad, 
 Baitiwu, ridden during the campaign against Xue Rengao. 
 Telebiao, ridden during the campaign against Song Jingang. Its name is originally 特勤 Teqin, derived from the Turkic term Tegin. 
 Qingzhui, ridden during the campaign against Dou Jiande. 
 Saluzi, ridden during the campaign against Wang Shichong. Its name derives from the Turkic 'Isbara', itself a derivation from the Sanskrit 'Isvara' meaning prince.

The sculptures are regarded as ancient Chinese art treasures. They were stolen by smugglers in 1914 and two of them were successfully exfiltrated out (Quanmaogua and Saluzi) and today are exhibited at the Penn Museum at University of Pennsylvania, USA. The remaining four are exhibited in the Stele Forest museum of Xi'an.

Gallery

Notes

References
Loehr, Max, The Great Painters of China, 1980, Phaidon Press,  
, p. 171

7th-century sculptures
Chinese sculpture
Stone sculptures in China
Horses in art
Tourist attractions in Xi'an
Tang dynasty art
Emperor Taizong of Tang